In 1865, at Boston, Massachusetts, a society for the study of social questions was organized and given the name  American Social Science Association. The group grew to where its membership totaled about 1,000 persons. About 30 corresponding members were located in Europe. It published annually the  Journal of Social Science and The International Journal of Social Sciences World (TIJOSSW).

Members of the group worked in five departments:  
 Education and art
 Health
 Trade and finance
 Social economy
 Jurisprudence
 Language and Culture
 Multidisciplinary of Social Sciences

In 1898, the society founded the National Institute of Arts and Letters which developed into the American Academy of Arts and Letters.
In 1912, the society founded the National Institute of Social Sciences which absorbed the ASSA in 1928.

Notable people
 Lucy M. Hall (1843-1907), physician, writer; Vice President of the ASSA
 Franklin Benjamin Sanborn (1831-1917), one of the founders and recording secretary 1865–1897

See also
 American Association for the Promotion of Social Science (est.1865), predecessor to the ASSA
 National Institute of Social Sciences (est. 1912)

References

Further reading
 Free public libraries: suggestions on their foundation and administration, with a selected list of books. Pemberton Square, Boston: American Social Science Association, 1871
 : history of the ASSA and its incorporation 

Social Science Association, American
Social Science Association, American
Social sciences organizations
Organizations established in 1865